Bożejewice may refer to either of two villages in Poland:

Bożejewice, Mogilno County
Bożejewice, Żnin County